Wesley Glenn Jennings (born September 17, 1980) is an American criminologist.

Career 
He is currently a professor and department chair in the Department of Criminal Justice & Legal Studies at the University of Mississippi. He was previously a professor and coordinator of the doctoral program in the School of Criminal Justice at Texas State University and associate professor in the Department of Criminology at University of South Florida, where he was also the Department's associate chairman and undergraduate director. He has previously been recognized as the #1 criminologist in the world in a 2012 paper in the Journal of Criminal Justice Education. He is the former editor-in-chief of the American Journal of Criminal Justice and (with Lorie Fridell) the co-editor of Policing: An International Journal.

Research
Jennings has studied the effectiveness of police use of body-worn cameras in Orlando, Florida.

References

External links

Living people
Academic journal editors
University of South Carolina alumni
University of Florida alumni
University of South Florida faculty
Texas State University faculty
American criminologists
1980 births